Barefield or Gortlumman is a village and townland in County Clare, Ireland. It is located on the R458 road, with the M18 national primary road between Ennis and Gort skirting it. 

Barefield is in the Catholic parish of Doora-Barefield parish.
The village itself consists of The Church of the Immaculate Conception, Barefield National School, two shops and two pubs. Access to Barefield has changed in 2007 with the opening of the Ennis Bypass and changed again in 2010 upon the completion of the Gort Bypass.

People
 Hylda Queally (b. 1961) Hollywood talent agent.

References

See also
 List of towns and villages in Ireland

Towns and villages in County Clare